Jos Nijhuis (born 21 June 1957 in Utrecht) is a Dutch businessman, and the former Chief Executive of Schiphol Group, which runs Schiphol Airport.

Life and career
In 1978 he gained qualifications from a Hoger Economisch en Administratief Onderwijs Bedrijfseconomie.

Since 1 January 2009 he has been Chief Executive of the Schiphol Group, replacing Gerlach Cerfontaine.
On May 1, 2018, he has been succeeded by Dick Benschop as CEO.

Personal life
He is married with three children in their twenties.

References

External links
 Schiphol Airport
 

1957 births
Dutch chief executives in the airline industry
Businesspeople from Utrecht (city)
Living people